LEPL Giorgi Abramishvili Military Hospital of the Ministry of Defence of Georgia, also known as the Gori Military Hospital (გორის სამხედრო ჰოსპიტალი, goris samkhedro hospitali), is a medical facility operated by the Ministry of Defense of Georgia and located in the city of Gori. In its current form, the center was established on 15 August 2006, succeeding the Soviet-era military hospital based in Georgia's capital of Tbilisi.

The hospital is a 176-bed facility, providing general medical and surgical care as well as a 24-hour emergency service for military personnel as well as for civilians. About 25% of the patients being treated at the hospital at any one time are civilians. It also functions as a teaching hospital for the Tbilisi State Medical University.

History 
The ability of the hospital to respond to mass casualty events was put to test during the August 2008 war with Russia. Beyond the Georgian military personnel, most of the civilians injured in or around Gori were initially taken to the Gori hospital for treatment. On 13 August 2008, at around 2:00 a.m. local time, a rocket fired from a Russian military helicopter hit a group of medical staff members in the hospital yard, killing an emergency room physician, Giorgi Abramishvili, who had spent the 
previous four days operating on people wounded during the hostilities. The Human Rights Watch concluded that attack on the hospital, which was "clearly marked with a red cross", was a "serious violation of international humanitarian law". The hospital was named after Abramishvili in August 2013.

References 

Hospital buildings completed in 2006
Hospitals in Georgia (country)
Hospitals established in 2006
Military hospitals
2006 establishments in Georgia (country)
Buildings and structures in Gori, Georgia
Russo-Georgian War